"Mystify" is a song by Australian rock band INXS and is the fifth (and last) single from their 1987 album Kick.

The song was written by Andrew Farriss and Michael Hutchence as part of the first sessions for Kick. The song was first previewed to Australian audiences on the Australian Made tour in January 1987.

B-sides
The B-sides include remixes and LP versions of previous INXS songs, that following the trend of previous Kick releases, showcase the band's previous work. The German edition of the CD single included the 12" vinyl versions of "Shine Like It Does" and "Never Tear Us Apart" from the 1988 US Tour.

Track listing
UK 7"
"Mystify" (LP version)
"What You Need" (12" Remix)

UK 12" single
"Mystify" (LP version)
"Need You Tonight" (Ben Liebrand Remix)
"Devil Inside" (Extended Remix)
"Listen Like Thieves" (Album Version)

UK 12" global tour pack
"Mystify" (LP Version)
"Biting Bullets"
"Shine Like It Does" (Live)
"Never Tear Us Apart" (Live)

European 7"
"Mystify" (LP version)
"Need You Tonight" (Mendelsohn 7" Edit)

European 12" single
"Mystify"
"Need You Tonight" (Mendelsohn 7" Edit)
"Shine Like It Does" (Live)
"Never Tear Us Apart" (Live)

UK CDS
"Mystify" (LP Version)
"What You Need" (12" Remix)
"Listen Like Thieves" (Album Version)
"Devil Inside" (Extended Remix)

German CDS
"Mystify" (LP Version)
"What You Need" (12" Remix)
"Listen Like Thieves" (Album Version)
"Devil Inside" (Extended Remix)

Music video
The video is a performance-style video shot in black and white, showing the writers of the song, Hutchence and Farriss, starting with part of a piano instrumental version of "Never Tear Us Apart" and seemingly "composing" the song in the studio on a piano. The video then cuts to the band recording and then performing the track to a live audience. It was directed by Richard Lowenstein and produced by Hamish "Hulk" Cameron.

Charts

Mellow Trax version
In 2004, German DJ Mellow Trax remixed the song. His version peaked at no. 74 in Germany.

References

1987 songs
1989 singles
INXS songs
Song recordings produced by Chris Thomas (record producer)
Songs written by Andrew Farriss
Songs written by Michael Hutchence
Warner Music Group singles